The Australian Minister for Interior was a ministerial portfolio responsible for the local government and external territories administration. The portfolio was originally held by the Minister for Home Affairs from 1901 to 1932 and then Minister for the Interior in the first Lyons Ministry—subsuming his portfolios of Home Affairs and Transport.

The establishment of portfolios such as Transport, Immigration, Agriculture and Industry left the Minister for the Interior mainly responsible for administering the Australian Capital Territory and the Northern Territory, including, until 1967, the Australian Aboriginals residing there. On 19 December 1972 the interior portfolio was replaced in the Whitlam Ministry by the Minister for the Capital Territory and the Minister for the Northern Territory.  The Northern Territory portfolio was abolished on 28 September 1978, following the granting of self-government to the Northern Territory.  From July 1987, administration of the Australian Capital Territory was subsumed in the portfolio of Arts, Sport, the Environment, Tourism and Territories, anticipating ACT self-government on 11 May 1989.

List of Ministers for the Interior

The following individuals have been appointed as Minister for the Interior:

List of Ministers for the Capital Territory
The following individuals have been appointed as Minister for the Capital Territory:

See also

 Department of Home Affairs (1901–16)
 Department of Home and Territories
 Department of Home Affairs (1928–32)
 Department of the Interior (1932–39)
 Department of the Interior (1939–72)
 Department of Administrative Services (1975–84)
 Department of Home Affairs (1977–80)
 Department of Home Affairs and Environment (1980-84)
 Department of Local Government and Administrative Services (1984-87)
 Department of the Arts, Sport, the Environment, Tourism and Territories (1987-91)
 Department of the Arts, Sport, the Environment and Territories (1991-93)
 Department of the Environment, Sport and Territories (1993-97)
 Department of Transport and Regional Development (1996-98)
 Department of Transport and Regional Services (1998-07)
 Department of Infrastructure, Transport, Regional Development and Local Government (2007-2010
 Department of Regional Australia, Regional Development and Local Government (2010-2011)
 Department of Regional Australia, Local Government, Arts and Sport (2011-2013)

References

Territories